The 1922 Utah Agricultural Aggies football team was an American football team that represented Utah Agricultural College in the Rocky Mountain Conference (RMC) during the 1922 college football season. In their fourth season under head coach Dick Romney, the Aggies compiled a 5–4 record (3–3 against RMC opponents), finished fourth in the RMC, and outscored opponents by a total of 132 to 83.

Schedule

References

Utah Agricultural
Utah State Aggies football seasons
Utah State Aggies football